JS Oyashio (SS-590) is the lead boat of the s. She was commissioned on 16 March 1998.

Construction and career
Oyashio was laid down at Kawasaki Heavy Industries Kobe Shipyard on 26 January 1994 and launched on 15 October 1996. She was commissioned on 16 March 1998 and deployed to Yokosuka.

From 11 January to 10 April 2006, she participated in RIMPAC 2006.

A part of the stern of the fishing boat was damaged and dropped, but no one was injured. The fishing boat was chartered by the Maritime Self-Defense Force and was wary of other vessels from approaching during the performance test of Oyashio. On 8 December of the same year, the Kagoshima Maritime Security Department sent documents to the captain and three others on suspicion of the risk of a possible traffic incident.

On 6 March 2015, due to the removal of the training submarine , Oyashios designation was changed to a training submarine on the same date, and the first training submarine under the direct control of the submarine fleet. After joining the corps, the submarine's fixed port was transferred to Kure.

On 3 April, she entered Subic Bay on Luzon Island, Philippines, facing the South China Sea.

Citations

External links

1996 ships
Oyashio-class submarines
Ships built by Kawasaki Heavy Industries
Training ships of the Japan Maritime Self-Defense Force